Jealous Ones Still Envy (J.O.S.E.) is the fourth studio album by American rapper Fat Joe. Originally scheduled for a summer 2000 release, the album was released on December 4, 2001, by Atlantic Records, Warner Music Group, and Fat Joe's Terror Squad Productions. The title is a reference to Fat Joe's second album, Jealous One's Envy.

The album peaked at number 21 on the US Billboard 200 chart. The album was later certified Platinum by the Recording Industry Association of America (RIAA) for shipping and selling over a million copies in the US.

Critical reception
The album received generally positive reviews. Jason Birchmeier from AllMusic gave the album a positive review, saying that "Joe's still putting it down for N.Y.C., repping himself as part thug, part player." Birchmeier also talked about how it is the age-old scenario—if Joe's not keepin' it real on the streets the grimy way, he's loungin' like a pimp and livin' large" and that "A few albums into his career, Joe has this approach down to a science." Overall the album was giving a rating of 3.5 stars by the critic.

Commercial performance
Jealous Ones Still Envy (J.O.S.E.) debuted at number 37 on the US Billboard 200 chart, on the week of December 22, 2001. After climbing the chart for weeks, the album reached its peak at number 21 on the week of April 20, 2002. On May 22, 2002, the album was certified platinum by the Recording Industry Association of America (RIAA) for sales of over a million copies in the United States.

Track listing
Credits adapted from the album's liner notes.

Sample credits
 "King of N.Y." contains excerpts from the composition "Just Memories", written by Leonard Caston Jr. and Anita Poree, performed by Eddie Kendricks.
 "Opposites Attract (What They Like)" contains excerpts from "Fresh Air", written by Jesse Farrow, performed by Quicksilver Messenger Service.
 "Fight Club" contains samples from the composition "Stop! In the Name of Love", written by Lamont Dozier, Brian Holland, and Eddie Holland, as performed by Margie Joseph.
 "It's O.K." contains excerpts from "How I Could Just Kill a Man", written by Louis Freese, Lowell Fulson, Jimmy McCracklin, Lawrence Muggerud, and Senen Reyes, performed by Cypress Hill.
 "The Wild Life" contains interpolations from the composition "Ike's Rap I" written by Isaac Hayes.
 "Still Real" contains excerpts from "You're the Joy of My Life", written by Raeford Gerald and Reginald Spruill, performed by Millie Jackson.

Charts

Weekly charts

Year-end charts

Certifications

References

2001 albums
Fat Joe albums
Atlantic Records albums
Albums produced by Cool & Dre
Albums produced by Buckwild
Albums produced by Rockwilder
Albums produced by the Alchemist (musician)
Albums produced by the Beatnuts
Albums produced by Grind Music
Albums produced by Irv Gotti
Albums produced by Bink (record producer)
Sequel albums